Delle Piane is a name of Genova and the Val Polcevera.
 Delle Piane family, Italian noble family

Origin 
A very ancient topographic name deriving from the medieval name “de Planis” deriving from the Latin form of Planum (meaning level ground, plain). 
Delle Piane “the dweller at the Plain” was the name for someone who lived on the plain of Genova and of the Val Polcevera; the name may derive from the place name where the family held land or from a manor house held or where they had a religious dwelling in the medieval ages.

Heraldry 
Several branches of the Delle Piane family were conferred the title of nobility of Nobile (aristocracy) and Dominus (title) in the renaissance. The name also served as feudal and noble Italian titles in other spellings in the rare forms of Conte del Piano of the Contea del Piano, Barone del Piano and Barone della Piana, the feudal castle Palazzo della Piana (meaning of the lands, landholder).

Coat of Arms:
Blue, with the Fortuna goddess standing on a globe or a wheel of fortune,
Coronet with 8 pearls (5 visible) of the title of nobility of Nobile (aristocracy), sometimes shortened with a “N.H.” prefix before the first name of each male descendant or “N.D.” for females.

Variants 
Dellepiane, Della Piana, Del Piano, De Pian, Delpiano, Dellipiani

Correspondences in other languages 
To the Genovese name Delle Piane and its derivatives correspond to the English name of Plain (from Plan), the French De la Plaine, and Spanish De los Llanos.

References 

Emidio De Felice. Dizionario dei cognomi italiani. Milano, Arnoldo Mondadori Editore, 1978.

Famous Delle Pianes 
Several soldiers, captains, knights, generals, elders, abbots, landowners, nobles and politicians carried the name.

Giovanni Maria delle Piane (il Mulinaretto) (1660–1745), Court Painter
Luis delle Piane (1865–1941), General
Giovanni Battista Dellepiane (1889–1961), Archbishop
Carlo delle Piane (1936-), Artist
Emanuelle delle Piane (1963-), Artist
Immanuel Dellepiane (1967-), Artist, Sculpture ( USA, Miami )